Michael Nugent is an Irish writer and activist.

Michael or Mike Nugent may also refer to:
 Michael Nugent (Australian footballer), Australian rules footballer
 Mike Nugent, American football placekicker
 Mike Nugent (soccer), American soccer player
 Mike Nugent (athlete), Australian Paralympian